Devil's Whisper is an American-Indonesian 2017 supernatural horror film directed by Adam Ripp and is about a demonic possession but at its core it's a psychological thriller about repressed memories, childhood trauma and the cycle of abuse. 15 year-old Alejandro Duran, who comes from a religious Latino family, aspires to one day be a Catholic priest. But when Alex discovers a mysterious box he unwittingly unleashes a demonic spirit bent on possessing him. Alex must find a way to defeat this ancient demon, which has been tormenting children since the dawn of man, before it destroys him and everyone he loves.

Cast

 Luca Oriel as Alex
 Tessie Santiago as Lucia 
 Alison Fernandez as  Alicia
 Marcos A. Ferraez as Marcos
 Violkys Bustamante
 Benjamin A. Hoyt
 Luna Maya as Dr. Dian
 Julia Modesto
 Olivia Negron
 Jasper Polish as Lia
 Rick Ravanello as Father Cutler
 Steven Shaw
 Coy Stewart as Gavin
 Justin Tinucci as Everett

References

External links
 
 
 

2017 films
Sony Pictures Entertainment
2017 horror films
2017 horror thriller films
American horror thriller films
American supernatural horror films
American supernatural thriller films
American horror drama films
American psychological horror films
American psychological thriller films
American psychological drama films
English-language Indonesian films
Indonesian supernatural horror films
2010s English-language films
2010s American films